Alejandro Ramírez Suárez (born May 23, 1992), better known as Sky Rompiendo, Sky Rompiendo el Bajo or just Sky is a Colombian producer, songwriter and DJ. He gained recognition working with reggaeton artists like Anitta, J Balvin, Ozuna, Maluma and Feid. He has received six Latin Grammy Awards as producer and songwriter.

Career
Ramírez was born on May 23, 1992, in Medellín, Colombia. His interest for music production began at 11 when he saw the digital audio workstation Fruity Loops at thehouse of one of his friends. In 2011, after studying at Berklee College of Music, he began to work as a record producer for Colombian artists, producing songs like "Amor de Verano" by Shako, "Cripy Cripy" by Yandar & Yostin and "En lo Oscuro" by J Balvin, during the production of the latter Ramírez got his artistic name, initially his nickname was Sky after being a part of a record producing duo named Sky High but after hearing the sentence "rompiendo el bajo" in the song he added it to his nickname transforming it into "Sky Rompiendo el Bajo" or just "Sky Rompiendo".

During 2012 and 2013, he continued to work with J Balvin in the songs "Yo Te Lo Dije", "Sola" and "6 AM", these songs would later be a part of Balvin's first studio album La Familia, released on October 29, 2013. The record peaked at number one in Colombia and at number 10 in the Billboard Top Latin Albums chart, the album also received a nomination for the Latin Grammy Award for Best Urban Music Album. Sky also worked in the songs "Bailame" by Feid and in "Hagan Fila" from Yaga & Mackie's sixth album Los Mackieavelikos HD.

Sky achieved commercial and international success with J Balvin as one of the songwriters and producers of the song "Ginza", released in 2015, the song spent twenty-one weeks at number one in the Billboard Hot Latin Songs chart, breaking the record for most weeks spent in that position by a song from a solo act. Since then, Sky has produced all studio albums by J Balvin to date, these being Energía (2016), Vibras (2018) and Colores (2020), plus also participating in Oasis (2019), the collaborative album by Balvin with Puerto Rican singer Bad Bunny, all the aforementioned albums have peaked at number one in the Billboard Top Latin Albums, with the exception of Colores that peaked at number two.

For his work as a producer, Sky has received several nominations at the Latin Grammy Awards, including four nominations for Album of the Year and two for Record of the Year, he has also won Best Urban Music Album three times and Best Urban Song twice. Sky has also received three nominations for Producer of the Year at the Billboard Latin Music Awards.

Discography

(A) Album, (S), Single

Awards and nominations

Latin Grammy Awards

Billboard Latin Music Awards

References

Colombian record producers
Latin music songwriters
Reggaeton record producers
1992 births
Living people